Ferrero Rocher is a chocolate and hazelnut confectionery, introduced in 1982 and produced by the Italian company Ferrero. Michele Ferrero is credited as the product's creator.

Each Ferrero Rocher ball is covered in foil and placed into a paper liner. The confection is machine made and much of its production process is designed to be secretive.

It is sold worldwide and holds a strong cultural presence, in part because of its association with Christmas. The brand is known in the United Kingdom, and other countries such as Mexico, by the popular 1990s 'ambassadors' advertisement.

History 
Ferrero Rocher was introduced in 1979 in Italy and in other parts of Europe in 1982. Shortly after its release, production was halted due to a problem with label printing. Michele Ferrero, the credited inventor, named the chocolate after a grotto in the Roman Catholic shrine of Lourdes, Rocher de Massabielle. Rocher comes from French and means rock or boulder.

Ingredients 
The chocolate consists of a whole roasted hazelnut encased in a thin wafer shell filled with hazelnut chocolate and covered in milk chocolate and chopped hazelnuts. Its ingredients are milk chocolate, sugar, cocoa butter, cocoa mass, skim milk powder, butteroil, lecithin as emulsifier (soy), vanillin (artificial flavor), hazelnuts, palm oil, wheat flour, whey (milk), low fat cocoa powder, sodium bicarbonate (leavening agent), and salt.

Production 

The production process is secretive, with no smartphones or notebooks allowed inside the production facilities. As of 2015, few journalists have ever been invited to visit. As of 2015, the production in the Alba factory totals 24 million Ferrero Rochers a day.

The sweet is produced by machinery. The process begins with flat sheets of wafer with hemispheres moving down an assembly line. The hemispheres of the wafers are then filled with a chocolate hazelnut cream and part of a hazelnut. Next, two of these wafer sheets, one with a hazelnut and one with hazelnut chocolate cream, are clamped together. The excess wafer is cut away producing wafer balls. These balls are then coated with a layer of chocolate, a layer of chopped hazelnuts, and a final layer of milk chocolate before the chocolate ball is wrapped in its prominent gold foil.

Distribution 
Roughly 3.6 billion Ferrero Rochers are sold each year in over 42 countries. These include 28 countries in Europe including the UK, eight countries in Asia, five countries in Africa including South Africa, nine countries in the Americas, and two countries in Oceania.

Cultural impact

Christmas 
Ferrero Rochers are associated with the holiday season during Christmas and New Year. As of 2015, 61% of Ferrero Rochers were sold within the last three months of the year.

1990s UK advertisement 
A United Kingdom advertisement in the 1990s was based upon a party in a European ambassador's official residence, with the chocolates arranged into a pyramid and portrayed as a sophisticated treat. The advertisement has been repeatedly parodied in popular culture since. In 2000, the ambassador's party commercial was ranked 21st in Channel 4's poll of "The 100 Greatest TV Ads".

Immigrant communities 

Because of Rocher's relatively low price compared with other luxury goods, along with its upscale appearance and marketing, the confection is popular among immigrant communities in the United States. Before Ferrero Rocher was available in mainland China, it was a popular gift from people in Hong Kong, who nicknamed Rocher "gold sand", to people on the mainland around Chinese New Year.

See also 
 Environmental impact of cocoa production
 Gianduiotto
 Gianduja (chocolate)

References

External links

 

Ferrero SpA brands
Products introduced in 1982
Chocolate confectionery